East Timor has competed in the IAAF World Athletics Championships three times with their first appearance being in 2011 at Daegu, South Korea with Ribeiro de Carvalho competing in the men's 1500m. As of 2019, the country has not recorded any medals with East Timor's best performance being in the same year when Ribeiro de Carvalho placed 37th in the Men's 1500 metres.

Entrants

References 

 
East Timor
World Athletics Championship